Eustra is a genus of beetles in the family Carabidae, containing the following species:

Species
 Eustra andrewesiana Deuve, 2001 
 Eustra bryanti Andrewes, 1919
 Eustra caeca Ueno, 1981 
 Eustra ceylanica Deuve, 2001 
 Eustra chinensis Banninger, 1949 
 Eustra crucifera Ueno, 1964 
 Eustra csikii Jedlicka, 1968
 Eustra deharvengi Deuve, 1986 
 Eustra gomyi Deuve, 2001 
 Eustra hammondi Deuve, 2001 
 Eustra honchongensi Deuve, 1996 
 Eustra indica Deuve, 2001 
 Eustra japonica Bates, 1892 
 Eustra lao Deuve, 2000 
 Eustra lebretoni Deuve, 1987
 Eustra leclerci (Deuve, 1986) 
 Eustra matanga Andrewes, 1919
 Eustra nageli Deuve, 2005 
 Eustra plagiata Schmidt-Goebel, 1846 
 Eustra pseudomatanga Deuve, 2001
 Eustra saripaensis Deuve, 2002 
 Eustra shanghaiensis Song, Tang, Peng, 2018
 Eustra storki Deuve, 2001
 Eustra taiwanica Deuve, 2001 
 Eustra troglophila Deuve, 1987

References

Paussinae